Sofia Romanskaya (1886–1969) was a Soviet astronomer known as one of the first Russian women to have a significant role in the field.

Biography 
Sofia (also spelled Sofya) Vasilievna Voroshilova-Romanskaya was born in St. Petersburg. She graduated from the Bestuzhev Courses, a prominent women's educational institution of the Russian Empire. 
Romanskaya worked at the Pulkovo Observatory from 1908 to 1959. There, she carried out over 20,000 latitude observations in her studies of polar motion. She was a member of the International Astronomical Union and attended the organization's 1958 General Assembly in Moscow.

The asteroid (3761) Romanskaya, discovered by Grigory Neujmin in 1936, was named after Romanskaya. A crater on Venus also bears her name.

References 

1886 births
1969 deaths
Women astronomers
Soviet astronomers
Russian astronomers
Soviet women scientists